The 2024 United States Senate election in Florida will be held on November 5, 2024, to elect a member of the United States Senate to represent the state of Florida. Incumbent one-term Republican Senator Rick Scott was elected with 50.05% of the vote in 2018. He is running for re-election to a second term in office.  Senator Scott has announced plans to seek the seat for a second term, despite earlier rumors he may have opted instead to run for President.

Republican primary

Candidates

Declared
Rick Scott, incumbent U.S. Senator (2019–present)

Potential
Keith Gross, assistant state attorney for Florida's 18th circuit court

Declined

Endorsements

Democratic primary

Candidates

Filed paperwork
Matt Boswell
Bernard Korn, realtor and perennial candidate
Josue Larose, businessman and perennial candidate
Matthew Sanscrainte, hospitality management consultant

Potential
Fentrice Driskell, Minority Leader of the Florida House of Representatives (2022–present) from the 67th district (2018–present)
Shevrin Jones, state senator from the 35th district (2021–present)

Declined
Anna Eskamani, state representative (2018–present) (running for re-election)
Andrew Warren, suspended Hillsborough County State's Attorney (2017–2022)

Independents and third-party candidates

Filed paperwork 
James Davis (Write-in), code enforcement officer and U.S. Marine Corps veteran
Randy Toler (Green Party)

General election

Predictions

References

External links
Official websites 
Keith Gross (R) for Senate
Rick Scott (R) for Senate

2024
Florida
United States Senate